Hedley Vicars Dickson (March 3, 1858 – April 24, 1942) was a Canadian politician. He served in the Legislative Assembly of New Brunswick as member of the Conservative party representing Kings County from 1912 to 1930.

References

20th-century Canadian politicians
1858 births
1942 deaths
Progressive Conservative Party of New Brunswick MLAs